Cornelia "Cora" van Nieuwenhuizen-Wijbenga (born 12 June 1963) is a Dutch politician of the People's Party for Freedom and Democracy (VVD). She served as Minister of Infrastructure and Water Management in the Third Rutte cabinet from 2017 to 2021, and briefly as Minister of Economic Affairs and Climate Policy (ad interim) in 2021.

Education
Van Nieuwenhuizen studied social geography at Utrecht University, as well as at Nyenrode Business University in Breukelen and at TIAS School for Business and Society in Tilburg.

Political career

Early career in local politics
Van Nieuwenhuizen was a member of the municipal council of Oisterwijk from 1994 to 2006 as well as party group leader from 2002 to 2003. She was also a member and party group leader in the States-Provincial of North Brabant from 2003 to 2007 and a member of the States Deputed of North Brabant from 2007 to 2010, in charge of mobility and infrastructure.

Member of the House of Representatives, 2010–2014
Elected to the House of Representatives in the 2010 election, she was reelected in 2012. In Parliament, she presided over the Finance Committee.

Member of the European Parliament, 2014–2017
Van Nieuwenhuizen was elected a Member of the European Parliament in the 2014 election. In the House of Representatives she was succeeded by Jeroen van Wijngaarden. A member of the ALDE (Group of the Alliance of Liberals and Democrats for Europe) political faction, she served as her parliamentary group's deputy coordinator on the Committee on Economic and Monetary Affairs (alongside Sylvie Goulard). On the committee, she was the rapporteur on financial technology. Later, she joined the Special Committee on Tax Rulings and Other Measures Similar in Nature or Effect in 2015. In addition, she held the position of vice-chairwoman of the parliament's delegation for relations with India.

Besides her committee assignments, Van Nieuwenhuizen was a member of the European Parliament Intergroup on Long Term Investment and Reindustrialisation and the European Parliament Intergroup on LGBT Rights.

Van Nieuwenhuizen mainly focused on matters of aviation, water transport and energy policy. She served as an MEP from until her appointment to the Government of the Netherlands.

Minister of Infrastructure and Water Management, 2017–2021
From 26 October 2017, Van Nieuwenhuizen served as Minister of Infrastructure and Water Management in the third cabinet of Prime Minister Mark Rutte. One of the main policy debates during her tenure revolved around the opening of Lelystad Airport to commercial traffic.

After the fall of the Third Rutte cabinet and consequently the resignation of Eric Wiebes, Van Nieuwenhuizen became ad interim Minister of Economic Affairs and Climate Policy on 15 January 2021 as well, until then-State Secretary Bas van 't Wout was selected as his replacement on 20 January 2021.

Later career
In 2021, Van Nieuwenhuizen resigned from government to become chair of Energie-Nederland, the lobbying organization for the country's energy sector.

Other activities
 Brabant Intermodal, chairwoman of the Advisory Board
 Hans Nord Foundation, Member of the Board

References

External links

Official
  Drs. C. (Cora) van Nieuwenhuizen-Wijbenga Parlement.com

1963 births
Living people
20th-century Dutch politicians
20th-century Dutch women politicians
21st-century Dutch politicians
21st-century women MEPs for the Netherlands
Dutch accountants
Dutch geographers
Dutch lobbyists
Members of the House of Representatives (Netherlands)
Members of the Provincial Council of North Brabant
Members of the Provincial-Executive of North Brabant
MEPs for the Netherlands 2014–2019
Ministers of Economic Affairs of the Netherlands
Ministers of Infrastructure of the Netherlands
Ministers of Water Management of the Netherlands
Municipal councillors in North Brabant
Nyenrode Business University alumni
People from Oisterwijk
People from Ridderkerk
People's Party for Freedom and Democracy MEPs
People's Party for Freedom and Democracy politicians
Politicians from Rotterdam
Social geographers
Tilburg University alumni
Utrecht University alumni
Women government ministers of the Netherlands